Sankissa (also Sankasia, Sankassa and Sankasya) was an ancient city in India. The city came into prominence at the time of Gautama Buddha. According to a Buddhist source, it was thirty leagues from Savatthi. After the Gautama Buddha's Mahaparinirvana (passing away) king Ashoka developed this place and installed one of his famous Pillars of Ashoka in the city, from which the elephant capital survives. He also built a stupa and a temple commemorating the visit of the Buddha. This temple exists even today and the ruins of the stupa are also present as a temple of Vishari Devi. It is said that the name Visahari Devi is given to the mother of the Buddha.

Currently it has ruins of old monasteries and Buddhist monuments. It is rarely visited by pilgrims since it is difficult to go to, and there are not many facilities. After a long time Alexander Cunningham (British) discovered the place in 1842. Eighty-seven years later Anagarika Dharmapala (Sri Lanka) came here on spiritual quest. In 1957 Panditha Madabawita Wijesoma Thero (Sri Lanka) came to 'Sankissa' for few years and started a Buddhist school (Wijesoma Widyalaya) for poor people.

Sankissa is now identified with Sankisa Basantapura on the north bank of the Ikkhumati river (Kalinadi), between Kampil and Kannauj, twenty-three miles west of Fatehgarh, twenty-five south of Kaimganj and forty-five north of Kannauj, in Farrukhabad district of Uttar Pradesh state of India.

Sankissa at the time of Ramayana
It was known as Sankasya Nagar and was ruled by king Kushadhwaja, was a younger brother of Janaka, the father of Sita, the female lead of Ramayana and wife of Rama. Once Sudhanva, supposedly an evil king of Sankasya Nagar, demands the hand of Sita from Janaka. In a war that ensues, Janaka defeats and perhaps kills Sudhanva. He bestows the kingdom of Sankasya to Kushadhwaja.

Ancient Buddhist events at Sankassa

Sankissa received its fame from statements and claims recorded in the Tipitaka.

It was at Sankissa that the Buddha returned to earth, after preaching the Abhidhamma Pitaka in Tavatimsa, following the performance of the Twin Miracle under the Gandamba tree. As the time approached for the Buddha to leave Távatimsa, Moggallana (Anuruddha, according to Sutta Nipāta Commentary ii 570) announced his coming return to the multitude, who had been waiting at Savatthi, fed by Culla Anathapindika, while Moggallana expounded the Dhamma. They then made their way to Sankissa. The descent of the Buddha took place on the day of the Mahapavarana festival. Sakka provides three ladders for the Buddha's descent from Sineru to the earth: on the right was a ladder of gold for the gods; on the left a silver ladder for Maha Brahma and his retinue; and in the middle a ladder of jewels for the Buddha. The assembled people covered the earth for thirty leagues round. There was a clear view of the nine Brahma worlds above and of Avici (a hell) below. The Buddha was accompanied by Pañcasikha, Mátali, Mahá Brahmá and Suyáma. Sariputta was the first to welcome him (followed by Uppalavanna, and the Buddha preached the Law, starting with what was within the comprehension even of a puthujjana, and ending with what only a Buddha could understand.

On this occasion was preached the Parosahassa Játaka to proclaim to the multitude the unparalleled wisdom of Sáriputta. It is said that the Buddha's descent to Sankissa had provided opportunity for Moggallána to show his eminence in iddhi, Anuruddha in dibbacakkhu, and Punna in skill in preaching, and the Buddha wished to give Sariputta a chance of shining in his wisdom. He therefore asked of Sáriputta questions which no one else could answer. The opening words of the Sáriputta Sutta are supposed to refer to this descent from Tusita.

The site of the city gate of Sankissa is one of the "unchangeable" spots of the world (avijahitatthanam). All Buddhas descend at that spot to the world of men after preaching the Abhidhamma. From Sankissa the Buddha went to Jetavana.

Architecture

A shrine was erected on the spot where the Buddha's right foot first touched the ground at Sankissa. When the Chinese pilgrims, Xuanzang and Faxian, visited the place, they found three ladders, which had been built of brick and stone by the ancients, to commemorate the Buddha's descent, but the ladders were nearly sunk in the earth.

There was, in the Buddha's time, a deer park at Sankissa where Suhemanta Thera heard the Buddha preach. During the Vajjiputta controversy, Revata Thera, on his way from Soreyya to Sahajati, went through Sankissa. The road he took passed through Sankissa, Kannakujja, Udumbara and Aggalapura. The excavations carried out in the place did not reveal any artifacts of importance.

An elephant capital from the period of the Mauryas was found at the site.

Location

Sankissa is about 250 km and is a 4 hours 30 minutes' drive from Kanpur Airport.

References

External links

Sankassa Video Documentary (in Sinhalese) Ancient Buddhist events at Sankissa
 http://www.palikanon.com/english/pali_names/sa/sankassa.htm
 maps.google The place where Lord Buddha show Twin Miracle (Pali:Yamaka Patihara). - Sravasti
 maps.google The place where Lord Buddha came down from Daowadung. - Sankisa

Ancient Indian cities
History of Uttar Pradesh
Buddhist pilgrimage sites in India
Places in the Ramayana
Buddhist sites in Uttar Pradesh
Farrukhabad district